Fenton Williams  is  a production designer and video director. He has worked with Dave Matthews Band since 1991. He began as their road manager and has served as Dave Matthews Band's lighting designer and video director for the last 20 years. He has also worked with acts such as John Mayer, Eric Clapton, and Liza Minnelli and events such as Bonnaroo Music Festival, Z100's Jingle Ball & Nashville Rising.

Other than his work with Dave Matthews Band, Williams worked with Tim McGraw as the set and lighting designer for McGraw's 2010 Southern Voice Tour, 2011 Emotional Traffic Tour, & the Zac Brown Band with his company Filament Productions. In 2004, Williams filled in for Phish's lighting director, Chris Kuroda, for their 3-day gig in Las Vegas. In 2005, Williams founded Filament Productions, a touring video company, based in Charlottesville, VA. In addition to producing the set and lighting design for Tim McGraw's 2010 Southern Voice Tour, Filament Productions is also in charge of the video direction and production design. Williams has also directed many live concert DVDs and Music Videos.

Credits 

All tours took place in North America unless otherwise noted.

References

External links 
Filament Productions
Filament Productions Official Twitter
Dave Matthews Band Official Website
Ants Marching - DMB Fan Website

American lighting designers
Living people
People from Charlottesville, Virginia
Dave Matthews Band
American music video directors
Year of birth missing (living people)